Nixi may refer to:

 National Internet Exchange of India (NIXI)
 Nixi chicken, a breed of chicken from Yunnan, China
 Di nixi, childbirth deities in ancient Rome
Nixi, one of the names for Neck (water spirit)

See also 
 Nixie (disambiguation)
 Nixe (disambiguation)